This is a list of seasons played by Swindon Town Football Club in English and European football, from the club's formation in 1879 to the present day. It details the club's achievements in major competitions, and the top scorers for each season where known.

Seasons

Key

P – Played
W – Games won
D – Games drawn
L – Games lost
GF – Goals for
GA – Goals against
Pts – Points
Pos – Final position

Prem – Premier League
Champ – EFL Championship
Lge 1 – EFL League One
Lge 2 – EFL League Two
Div 1 – Football League First Division
Div 2 – Football League Second Division
Div 3 – Football League Third Division
Div 3(S) – Football League Third Division South
Div 4 – Football League Fourth Division
SL Div1 – Southern League Division One
WFL – Western Football League
UL – United League
n/a – Not applicable

QR – Qualifying round
IR – Intermediate round
GS – Group stage
R1 – First round
R2 – Second round
R3 – Third round
R4 – Fourth round
R5 – Fifth round
QF – Quarter-finals
SF – Semi-finals
RU – Runners-up
W – Winners
(S) – Southern section of regionalised stage

Overall
 Seasons spent at Level 1 of the football league system: 1
 Seasons spent at Level 2 of the football league system: 18
 Seasons spent at Level 3 of the football league system: 64
 Seasons spent at Level 4 of the football league system: 8

Footnotes

References
 
 
 

Seasons
 
Swindon Town
Swindon Town